Johannes Moser (born June 14, 1979 in Munich) is a German-Canadian cellist. He began studying the cello at the age of eight and became a student of David Geringas in 1997.

He has performed with the world's leading orchestras including the Berlin Philharmonic, New York Philharmonic, Los Angeles Philharmonic, Hong Kong Philharmonic, Munich Philharmonic and Israel Philharmonic Orchestras as well as the Chicago Symphony, London Symphony, Bavarian Radio Symphony, Frankfurt Radio Symphony, Royal Concertgebouw Orchestra, Tokyo Symphony, Philadelphia and Cleveland Orchestras.

A dedicated chamber musician, Moser has played with Joshua Bell, Emanuel Ax, Leonidas Kavakos, Menahem Pressler, James Ehnes, Midori and Jonathan Biss. He has also performed at many festivals including the Verbier, Schleswig-Holstein, Gstaad and Kissinger festivals, the Mehta Chamber Music Festival and the Colorado, Seattle and Brevard music festivals.

In March 2015, Moser signed with PENTATONE as an exclusive recording artist.

Awards 
 ECHO Klassik 2017 award for Instrumentalist of the Year
 Preis der Deutschen Schallplattenkritik 2011 for cello concertos by Bohuslav Martinu, Paul Hindemith, Arthur Honegger on Hänssler Classics.
 ECHO Klassik 2008 award for Instrumentalist of the Year
 ECHO Klassik 2007 award for Young Artist
 International Tchaikovsky Competition 2002 – Second Prize; Special Prize for his interpretation of the Rococo Variations

Discography 
Martinů Cello Sonatas - Johannes Moser, Andrei Korobeinikov. PENTATONE PTC: 5187007 (2022)
Fernando Velázquez: Viento – Johannes Moser, Basque National Orchestra. Pentatone PTC: 5186977 (2022) 
Felix & Fanny Mendelssohn – Works for Cello and Piano. Johannes Moser, Alasdair Beatson. PENTATONE PTC 5186781 (2019) 
Lutoslawski & Dutilleux Cello Concertos. Johannes Moser, Thomas Søndergård, Rundfunk-Sinfonieorchester Berlin PENTATONE PTC 5186689 (2018) 
Elgar & Tchaikovsky. Johannes Moser, Andrew Manze, Orchestre de la Suisse Romande. PENTATONE PTC 5186570 (2017) 
 Rachmaninov & Prokofiev – Works for Cello and Piano. Johannes Moser, Andrei Korobeinikov. PENTATONE PTC 5186594 (2016) 
 Antonín Dvořák, Édouard Lalo – Cello Concertos. Johannes Moser, Jakub Hrůša, Prague Philharmonia. PENTATONE PTC 5186488 (2015)

References

External links
Official website

German classical cellists
Hochschule für Musik Hanns Eisler Berlin alumni
1979 births
Living people
21st-century cellists